WUUU (98.9 FM, "Cat Country 98.9") is a United States country music-formatted radio station with offices in  Covington, Louisiana and Hammond, Louisiana. The station, which is owned by Pittman Broadcasting Services, LLC., operates with an ERP of 25 kW.

History
The station signed on the air in 1995 as a class A station playing country music owned by Gaco Broadcasting Corp. In May 2002, the station was sold to Marcus Pittman, III.

On December 18, 2013, the station was relocated to a new transmitter site just north of Folsom, Louisiana, and upgraded to a Class C3 operating at 25,000 watts.

Callsign history
The WUUU call sign once belonged to WNFZ/94.3 of Powell, Tennessee, in the 1970s. They were also used from 1982 to 1993 by WUMX/102.5 of Utica, New York, and from 1993 to 1996 by WARW/93.5 in Remsen, New York.

References

External links
Station Website
Station Facebook

Radio stations in Louisiana
Country radio stations in the United States
Radio stations established in 1995
1995 establishments in Louisiana